
Gmina Ostrów is a rural gmina (administrative district) in Ropczyce-Sędziszów County, Subcarpathian Voivodeship, in south-eastern Poland.

Villages
Gmina Ostrów contains the villages and settlements of Blizna, Borek Mały, Kamionka, Kozodrza, Ocieka, Ostrów, Sadykierz, Skrzyszów, Wola Ociecka and Zdżary.

Neighbouring gminas
Gmina Ostrów is bordered by the gminas of Dębica, Niwiska, Przecław, Ropczyce and Sędziszów Małopolski.

References
Polish official population figures 2006

Ostrow
Ropczyce-Sędziszów County